Gorny is a rural locality (a settlement) in Kabansky District, Republic of Buryatia, Russia. The population was 159 as of 2010.

Geography 
Gorny is located 21 km southwest of Kabansk (the district's administrative centre) by road. Posolskaya is the nearest rural locality.

References 

Rural localities in Kabansky District